Willoughby Community Park Stadium is an artificial turf field located in the Township of Langley, British Columbia, near the Langley Events Centre. It is planned to be a high capacity stadium for the newly founded Vancouver FC soccer team, however as of right now, seating has yet to be constructed. It is one of four sports fields in Willoughby Park.

See also
Percy Perry Stadium
Swangard Stadium

References

Sports venues in British Columbia